Mauceri is a surname. Notable people with the surname include:

John Mauceri (born 1945), American conductor, producer, educator, and writer 
Patricia Mauceri (born 1950), American actress